Thomas Winship (July 1, 1920 – March 14, 2002) was an American journalist who served as editor of The Boston Globe from 1965 until 1984.

Biography
Winship was born in Cambridge, Massachusetts, and soon after moved to Sudbury. He graduated from Belmont Hill School in 1938. He made the first ascent of Alaska's Mount Bertha in 1940. He graduated from Harvard in 1942, where he founded the ski club. Winship's paternal grandfather, Albert Edward Winship, was an editor of the Journal of Education. His father, Laurence L. Winship, joined The Boston Globe in 1912, became managing editor in 1937, and was named editor in 1955. The younger Winship succeeded his father as editor in 1965, and held the position until retiring in 1984.

Winship helped raise the Globe to the highest ranks and guided it to 12 Pulitzer Prizes as a result of the Globe's opposition to the Vietnam War and coverage of school desegregation in the 1970s. The Pulitzers won under his leadership, beginning in 1966, were the first in Globe history. 

After his retirement, Winship was the first senior fellow at the Gannett Center for Media Studies (now the Freedom Forum) and the founding chairman of the Center for Foreign Journalists. At the time of his death, Winship was being treated for lymphoma at Massachusetts General Hospital in Boston. He was survived by his wife, Elizabeth Coolidge Winship (author of the syndicated "Ask Beth" advice column), sister Joanna Crawford, sons Laurence and Benjamin, daughters Margaret and Joanna, and eight grandchildren.

References 

1920 births
2002 deaths
People from Cambridge, Massachusetts
People from Sudbury, Massachusetts
Harvard University alumni
The Boston Globe people
Editors of Massachusetts newspapers
20th-century American newspaper editors
Elijah Parish Lovejoy Award recipients